Hannes Baldauf (9 March 1938 – 25 February 2015) was a German football player and coach.

Career
Baldauf was involved with Hannover 96 as both a player and a manager.

References

External links
  (manager profile contains link to player profile)

1938 births
2015 deaths
People from Vogtlandkreis
German footballers
Footballers from Saxony
Association football defenders
Hannover 96 players
Bundesliga players
German football managers
Hannover 96 managers
FC Augsburg managers
SpVgg Greuther Fürth managers